is a former Japanese football player.

Playing career
Senuma was born in Tokyo on September 7, 1978. He joined J1 League club Verdy Kawasaki (later Tokyo Verdy) from youth team in 1997. Although he debuted and played several matches in 1998, he could hardly play in the match until 1999. In 2000, he moved to Vissel Kobe on loan. Although he could not play many matches, he scored goals. In 2001, he returned to Verdy. However he could hardly play in the match and retired end of 2001 season.

Club statistics

References

External links

1978 births
Living people
Association football people from Tokyo
Japanese footballers
J1 League players
Tokyo Verdy players
Vissel Kobe players
Association football midfielders